Columnea sanguinolenta is a species of Gesneriaceae that is native to Colombia, Costa Rica, and Panama.

References

External links
 
 

sanguinolenta
Plants described in 1865
Flora of Colombia